Lee King may refer to:

 Lee King (outfielder, born 1892)
 Lee King (outfielder, born 1894)